Dixeia cebron, the Cebron white, is a butterfly in the family Pieridae. It is found in Ivory Coast, Ghana, southern Nigeria, Cameroon, the Republic of Congo, Gabon, and possibly the western part of the Democratic Republic of Congo. The habitat consists of dry and open forests.

References

Seitz, A. Die Gross-Schmetterlinge der Erde 13: Die Afrikanischen Tagfalter. Plate XIII 14

Butterflies described in 1871
Pierini
Butterflies of Africa
Taxa named by Christopher Ward (entomologist)